The 2012–13 Montenegrin Cup was the seventh season of the Montenegrin knockout football tournament. The winner of the tournament received a berth in the first qualifying round of the 2013–14 UEFA Europa League. The defending champions were Čelik, who beat Rudar in the final of the 2011–12 competition. The competition featured 30 teams. It will start on 19 September 2012 and end with the final on 22 May 2013.

First round
The 14 matches in this round will be played on 18 and 19 September 2012.

Summary

|}

Matches

Second round
The 14 winners from the First Round and last year's cup finalists, Čelik and Rudar, compete in this round. Starting with this round, all rounds of the competition will be two-legged except for the final.  The first legs were held on 3 October 2012, while the second legs were held on 24 October 2012.

Summary

|}

First legs

Second legs

Quarter-finals
The eight winners from the Second Round competed in this round. The first legs took place on 7 and 21 November 2012 and the second legs took place on 21 and 28 November 2012.

Summary

|}

First legs

Second legs

Semi-finals
The four winners from the quarter-finals competed in this round. These matches took place on 3 and 16 April 2013.

Summary

|}

First legs

Second legs

Final

References

External links
Montenegrin Cup 2012-2013 (pages 57-63) at Football Association of Montenegro's official site
Montenegrin Cup 2012-2013 at Soccerway

Montenegrin Cup seasons
Montenegrin Cup
Cup